Governor Osborn or Osborne may refer to:

Chase Osborn (1860–1949), 27th Governor of Michigan
Sir Danvers Osborn, 3rd Baronet (1715–1753), Colonial Governor of New York Province in 1753
Henry Osborn (Royal Navy officer) (1694–1771), Commodore-Governor of Newfoundland from 1729 to 1730
Sidney Preston Osborn (1884–1948), 7th Governor of Arizona
Thomas A. Osborn (1836–1898), 6th Governor of Kansas
John Eugene Osborne (1858–1943), 3rd Governor of Wyoming